Euchromius donum is a species of moth in the family Crambidae. It is found in Ethiopia.

The length of the forewings is about 14 mm. The groundcolour of the forewings is creamy white, densely suffused with ochreous to dark brown scales. The hindwings are grey-brown with a darkly bordered termen. Adults have been recorded in April.

References

Moths described in 1988
Crambinae
Moths of Africa